The Wigan Metropolitan Borough Council is the local authority for the Metropolitan Borough of Wigan in the United Kingdom. It consists of 75 Councillors with one-third being elected every three years in four. The borough is separated into 25 wards. Councillors are democratically accountable to the ward they are elected to represent. Each ward is represented on the council by three council members.

Council members by ward
This is a list of the current Wigan Metropolitan Borough Council:

Cabinet
Eight councillors are appointed to the cabinet who are each a 'Portfolio Holder' for an area of responsibility. (Such as 'Portfolio Holder for Environment').

Deaths in office

On 28 January 2013, Barbara Bourne, a representative of Pemberton since 1996, died in office following a long term illness. She was responsible for a long campaign for a new medical centre, which was opened in the area of Kitt Green, in 2010.

Local election results

See also
County Borough of Wigan
Deputy Mayor of Wigan
Mayor of Wigan
Metropolitan Borough of Wigan

Notes

References

External links
 

Local government in the Metropolitan Borough of Wigan
Metropolitan district councils of England
Local authorities in Greater Manchester
Local education authorities in England
Leader and cabinet executives
Billing authorities in England
1974 establishments in England